Gordon Edward Bolland (born 12 August 1943 in Boston, Lincolnshire) is an English retired footballer and manager.

A striker, Bolland joined Londoners Chelsea as a teenager, and was a member of the sides which won the FA Youth Cup in 1960 and 1961, alongside the likes of Peter Bonetti, Ron Harris, Terry Venables and Bobby Tambling. Despite this, he only made two appearances for the first team and was released in March 1962, after which he signed for Leyton Orient.

Bolland played for Orient during their only season in the English top flight, and scored 19 goals in 64 league games before joining Norwich City in 1964 for £31,500, where he scored 29 goals in 105 league matches. After a brief spell with Charlton Athletic, Bolland signed for Millwall for £10,000 in October 1968. Bolland proved to be a fast, skilful striker who could also drop into midfield to great effect. It was from this position that Bolland scored a spectacular goal against Bristol City on 16 October 1971 which won the Match Of The Day "Goal of the Month" award. In the 1972–73 season, Bolland scored 9 goals in seven consecutive league games. He remained with Millwall for seven years, scoring 62 goals in 244 games, and is an inductee of the club's Hall of Fame. He finished his career as player-manager of Boston United. Bolland has one great grandson called Alfie Fountain who hopes to follow in his footsteps.

External links
 Gordon Bolland Millwall Hall Of Fame

1943 births
Boston United F.C. players
Boston United F.C. managers
Charlton Athletic F.C. players
Chelsea F.C. players
English footballers
English football managers
Leyton Orient F.C. players
Living people
Millwall F.C. players
Norwich City F.C. players
People from Boston, Lincolnshire
Association football forwards